Von Maur, Inc.  is an American department store chain based in Davenport, Iowa. Founded in 1892, the chain operates over 36 locations across the United States, primarily in the Midwest.

History

Beginnings
In 1872, German immigrant J. H. C. Petersen and his three sons opened a store in a  storefront in downtown Davenport, Iowa. The store eventually expanded and moved into their flagship store, the Redstone Building at 2nd and Main Streets in Davenport. In 1916, J.H.C. Petersen's son, William D. Petersen, sold the family store to a partnership of R.H. Harned, C.J. von Maur, and Cable von Maur.

C.J. von Maur, who came from Austria, established the Boston Store (later renamed Harned & Von Maur) in downtown Davenport in 1887. Despite the common ownership, Petersen's and Harned & Von Maur continued to operate as separate stores for twelve years, even after C.J. von Maur died in 1926. On May 7, 1928, Harned & Von Maur merged with the Petersen's store in what is now known as the Redstone Building. The store was renamed Petersen Harned Von Maur, which was often shortened to "Petersen's". The von Maur family assumed complete ownership of the store after R.H. Harned died in 1937.

1970s–1980s

In the company's centennial year of 1972, Petersen Harned Von Maur opened its first branch store at Duck Creek Plaza in Bettendorf, Iowa. Another branch store opened at SouthPark Mall in Moline, Illinois, in 1974. In 1976, Petersen's opened its first store outside the Quad Cities area at Valley West Mall in West Des Moines, Iowa. The company continued to open new stores in shopping malls throughout Iowa and Illinois during the late 1970s and 1980s; along the way it acquired two former Killian's department stores in Cedar Rapids and Iowa City, Iowa, in 1981. As the company shifted its focus to malls, the Petersen Harned Von Maur flagship store in downtown Davenport closed in 1986. The Redstone Building is now home to the River Music Experience.

Petersen Harned Von Maur shortened its name to Von Maur in 1989 to reflect the von Maur family's management of the company. One year later, it moved its corporate headquarters and executive offices from the Redstone Building to a  building on Brady Street (near the interchange with Interstate 80) in Davenport. The company distributes all of its merchandise from this building using its own fleet of semi-trucks. It also has its own credit union and credit department as well as a print shop.

In 1989, Von Maur purchased stores vacated by Carson Pirie Scott at Hickory Point Mall in Forsyth and College Hills Mall in Normal.

1990s–2000s

Von Maur successfully entered the Chicago market in 1994 with a  flagship store at Yorktown Center in Lombard, Illinois.  Von Maur currently has 7 stores in Illinois, more than any other state.  From there, the company expanded its geographic reach into Indiana, Kansas, Kentucky, Minnesota, and Nebraska during the late 1990s and early 2000s while closing stores in Bettendorf, Iowa and Muscatine, Iowa, during this period. In 2004 Von Maur expanded into Michigan by taking over two mall locations of the defunct Jacobson's chain (The Briarwood Mall in Ann Arbor, Michigan, and Laurel Park Place in Livonia, Michigan). In late 2005 it opened a store at Polaris Fashion Place in Columbus, Ohio, the 23rd store in the chain. On January 31, 2007, Von Maur closed its store at Westdale Mall in Cedar Rapids, Iowa, which brought the store count down to 22.

On December 5, 2007, the Von Maur location in Westroads Mall in Omaha, Nebraska was the site of a terror attack when a mentally ill teenager entered the store with an assault rifle, killing 8 and injuring six more before killing himself.   

On Saturday, September 13, 2008, Von Maur opened its 23rd store, a  store in Phase II of The Greene, a project of Steiner Associates in Dayton, OH.

The 24th store at the Corbin Park Lifestyle Center in Overland Park, Kansas had its soft opening on Monday, November 3, 2008 and the grand opening on Saturday, November 8, 2008.

2010s–present

Today, the privately held company remains under the leadership of the Von Maur family, including co-chairmen Charles R. von Maur and Richard B. von Maur, as well as president James D. von Maur.  Von Maur offers free gift wrapping year-round as well as free shipping year-round. Von Maur caters to the typical middle-class consumer. In the past five years, the chain has expanded out of its Midwestern home territory to open stores in Georgia, Alabama, New York, and Oklahoma.

September 18, 2010 marked Von Maur's entrance into the St. Louis, Missouri market as the anchor of The Meadows shopping center in Lake St. Louis.

On November 11, 2010, Von Maur announced the chain would open its first store in the Southeast in the Atlanta suburb of Alpharetta. The regional flagship store would convert a former location previously occupied by Lord & Taylor, then Belk, at the North Point Mall into a much larger anchor.  The store opened in early November 2011.

In March 2011, it was reported Von Maur would enter the Wisconsin market with a store in the Milwaukee area at a new lifestyle shopping center in Brookfield named The Corners. The proposed store was to have been combined with a three story parking structure and had been predicted to open in the Fall of 2014, but numerous project delays occurred. Von Maur's 32nd location, it opened on April 8, 2017.

In September 2011, Von Maur announced that it would open a store in Coralville, Iowa at Iowa River Landing, replacing the chain's Iowa City store, previously located at Sycamore Mall.

In November 2011, it was announced that Von Maur would enter New York State with its first store at Eastview Mall, outside Rochester, replacing a Bon-Ton store.  Von Maur's first northeast location opened on October 26, 2013.

Von Maur announced in early January 2012 they would be opening their second Atlanta area store at the soon-to-be shuttered Bloomingdale's location at Perimeter Mall in north suburban Dunwoody, while the company's president said that he would like to have four or five stores in the market during this time. The three-story,  store opened on November 10, 2012.

On November 2, 2013, the chain opened its first store in Alabama, at the Riverchase Galleria in the Birmingham suburb of Hoover. The store is located in the space first occupied by Macy's, then Proffitt's, and later Belk.

On February 27, 2013, it was announced that Von Maur would be opening a new location in Oklahoma City as the fourth anchor store at Quail Springs Mall, replacing Sears. The  facility opened on October 18, 2014 and marked the 30th location for Von Maur.

In September 2016, Von Maur would open their third Georgia store in a former Nordstrom location at the Mall of Georgia in Buford, Georgia.

In March 2016, the company announced that it would open a second store in the Minneapolis-St. Paul area. The two-story, 140,000-square foot store at Rosedale Center opened on October 13, 2018, joining the existing store at Eden Prairie Center.

In February 2017, It was announced that the longstanding Sears store at Woodland Mall in the Grand Rapids suburb of Kentwood, Michigan, would close and will reopen as Von Maur in 2019 along with other additions to the mall.

In February 2018, the company announced it would open a store at the Jordan Creek Town Center in West Des Moines, Iowa. That store opened in 2022 and replaced the Valley West location.

In August 2022, the company announced it would open a store at South Hills Village in suburban Pittsburgh, the first store in the state of Pennsylvania.

References

Bibliography

External links
Official site

Davenport, Iowa
Companies based in the Quad Cities
Companies based in Iowa
Economy of the Midwestern United States
Department stores of the United States
Clothing retailers of the United States
Retail companies established in 1872
1872 establishments in Iowa